Ploemel is a commune in the Morbihan department of Brittany in north-western France.

Transportation 
The Belz-Ploemel railway station is served by TER Bretagne trains on the Auray-Quiberon railway during the summer.

See also 
Communes of the Morbihan department

References

External links

Mayors of Morbihan Association 
Official site 

Communes of Morbihan